Guy A. C. Brown (August 24, 1936 – April 5, 2009) was a politician in Nova Scotia, Canada. He represented Cumberland Centre, and then Cumberland South in the Nova Scotia House of Assembly, from 1974 to 1998.

He was born in Springhill, Nova Scotia in 1936, and served in the Canadian Army from 1956 to 1962. Brown served in the Executive Council of Nova Scotia as Minister of Consumer Affairs from 1976 to 1978, and Minister of Housing and Consumer Affairs from 1993 to 1996. Brown was mayor of Springhill from 2004 to 2008.

Brown died at the age of 72 on April 5, 2009, in Moncton, New Brunswick, after a lengthy illness.

References 
 Entry from Canadian Who's Who

1936 births
2009 deaths
Canadian Presbyterians
Nova Scotia Liberal Party MLAs
Mayors of places in Nova Scotia
Members of the Executive Council of Nova Scotia
People from Cumberland County, Nova Scotia